Teodoro Francesco Maria Gasparo Correr (12 December 1750, Venice - 20 February 1830, Venice) was a Venetian abbot and art collector, most notable as the founder of the Museo Correr.

Life
The Correr family was an old patrician family in Venice. Teodoro's father was Giacomo and his wife, the Neapolitan noblewoman Anna Maria Petagno, daughter of Andrea, from the princely family of Trebisaccia. Teodoro was the first of nine brothers and aged ten was sent to school with the Teatini at San Nicola da Tolentino. He only stayed there a year before moving to the San Cipriano college on Murano, which he left aged twenty-one in 1771. Even as a youth he became interested in collecting objects and artworks relating to Venice and its history.

When they reached twenty-five all Venetian patricians were required to take up minor magistracies and Correr reluctantly followed suit. In 1775 he entered the High Council and the same year was elected 'savio' to the Orders. The following year he was made provider of the Pompe and in 1778 he was re-elected 'savio' and made provider of the Comun. In 1787 he was elected Podestà and captain of Treviso, but he immediately gained dispensation from taking up this office. In 1788 he became podestà procurator at Verona. He only half-heartedly held public office and finally eschewed it altogether by becoming an abbot in 1789. He even declined to serve in the Civic Guard on health grounds during the Fall of the Republic of Venice in 1797 and instead paid a cash fine in monthly instalments.

After his parents died, he was able to commit himself to collecting full-time, though he had already begun forming a collection of paintings, relics and documents relating to Venetian history whilst still a young man. His collecting peaked during the years immediately after the Republic's fall and the resulting decision by many patrician families to sell off their whole art collections. Despite his limited means, he used his connections to other patrician families to buy and exchange paintings, coins, archaeology. majolica, glassware, books, engravings, gems, enamels, medals, curiosities, weapons, antiquities, bronzes and manuscripts. He installed his growing collection in his family palazzo in the San Giovanni Decollato district of the Santa Croce sestiere.

In old age he wondered how to ensure his collection stayed together after his death, rather than being dispersed by his brother. He wrote his will on 1 January 1830, stipulating:

This marked the beginning of Venice's city museums and formed the foundation stone for the current museum network in the city. Correr's collection formed the nucleus for the present-day Museo Correr, which moved in 1879 to the neighbouring Fondaco dei Turchi (now the Museo di Storia Naturale) then to the former Palazzo Reale (or Procuratie Nuovissime) on Piazza San Marco in 1922, where it still remains.

Selected works from the Correr collection 
 Embriachi workshop, Wedding Chest, mid 14th - early 15th centuries
 Pisanello, First medal of Lionello d'Este, 1441
 Matteo de' Pasti, Medal of Sigismondo Pandolfo Malatesta and Castel Sismondo, 1446
 Giovanni Bellini, Transfiguration, 1455-1460
 Giovanni Bellini, Crucifixion, circa 1455-1460 
 Cosmè Tura, Pietà, 1460
 Antonello da Messina, The Dead Christ Supported By Three Angels, 1474-1476
 Gentile Bellini, Portrait of Doge Giovanni Mocenigo, 1480
 Vittore Carpaccio, Two Venetian Ladies, 1490
 Jacopo de' Barbari, View of Venezia MD, primi anni del 1500
 Nicola da Urbino, Maiolica service, 1515

Bibliography (in Italian)
 Vincenzo Lazari, Notizia delle opere d'arte e d'antichità della raccolta Correr di Venezia, Venezia, Tipografia del Commercio, 1859, pp. III-IX, SBN IT\ICCU\RML\0082262.
 Giovanni Mariacher, Il Museo Correr di Venezia. Dipinti dal XIV al XVI secolo, Venezia, Neri Pozza, 1957, pp. 9–14, SBN IT\ICCU\NAP\0101931.
 Giandomenico Romanelli, CORRER, Teodoro Maria Francesco Gasparo, in Dizionario biografico degli italiani, vol. 29, Roma, Istituto dell'Enciclopedia Italiana, 1983. URL consultato il 04 dicembre 2017.
 Giandomenico Romanelli, "Vista cadere la patria...". Teodoro Correr tra "pietas" civile e collezionismo erudito, in Bollettino. Civici musei veneziani d'arte e di storia, vol. 30, 1986 (1988), pp. 13–25.
 Luisa Servadei, Michela Tombel (a cura di), Correr di San Giovanni decollato. Inventario dell'archivio (PDF), Venezia, 2014.

1750 births
1830 deaths
Italian abbots
Italian art collectors
Republic of Venice clergy
Teodoro
Museum founders
Teodoro